Kundryak (Künderäk) is a rural locality (a village) in Cherkassky Selsoviet, Ufimsky District, Bashkortostan, Russia. The population was 2 as of 2010. There is 1 street.

Geography 
Kundryak is located 36 km northeast of Ufa (the district's administrative centre) by road. Chuvarez is the nearest rural locality.

References 

Rural localities in Ufimsky District